Copernicus is a  Polish yacht of Opal Class. The owner is Yacht Club Stal Gdynia, Poland.

History and cruises 

The yacht Copernicus was built especially for the Whitbread Round The World Race 1973. She was slightly bigger than standard Opal II class - to get the 33 feet rating by IOR. The wooden hull was built in Gdańsk Boatyard Stogi, with help from the members of Yacht Club Stal Gdynia. The design was by Edmund Rejewski and Wacław Liskiewicz, also Zygfryd Perlicki.

The yacht took 11th place in Whitbread Round The World Race 1973. The skipper was Zygfryd Perlicki, and the crew was Zbigniew Puchalski, Bogdan Bogdzinski, Ryszard Mackiewicz and Bronislaw Tarnacki.

The yacht was used for youth training, cruising, partly chartering after the race. She sails mostly on Baltic Sea and North Sea.

She won the "Cruise of the year" prize in 2006 (in Poland) for the round-the-Iceland cruise.

Technical specifications 
Reg. number: PZ 30
Call Sign: SPG2191
 Shipyard: Gdansk Boatyard Stogi (later Conrad Yacht Shipyard)
 Build of: oak framing with pine elements, mahogany planking, deck: plywood with teak.
 Class: Opal III
 Sail area: 80m2
 Length: 14.11 m
 Breadth: 3.72 m
 Draft: 2.16 m
 Engine: Sole Diesel 45 (45 HP)
 Crew: 9 person

External links 
 Yacht Club Stal Gdynia, Poland
 Whitbread Round The World Race

Ships built in Gdańsk
1973 ships
Individual sailing vessels
1970s sailing yachts
Volvo Ocean Race yachts
Sailing yachts of Poland
Sailing yachts built in Poland